Melany Mayuri Jazmín Cayetano Ramírez (born 17 March 1990), known as Mayuri Cayetano, is a Guatemalan retired footballer who played as a forward. She has been a member of the Guatemala women's national team.

International career
Cayetano capped for Guatemala at senior level during the 2010 CONCACAF Women's World Cup Qualifying qualification and the 2014 CONCACAF Women's Championship.

References

1990 births
Living people
Guatemalan women's footballers
Guatemala women's international footballers
Women's association football forwards
Guatemalan people of Belizean descent
Garifuna people